August Ahrens (1779, Walbeck – 28 November 1841, Hettstedt) was a German entomologist who specialised in Coleoptera.

Works
Partial list
Ahrens, A. 1811: Beschreibung der großen Wasserkaeferarten der Gegend um Halle in Sachsen. Neue Schriften der naturforschenden Gesellschaft zu Halle, Halle – 1 (1809–1811) (6) 47-5
Ahrens, A. 1812. Beiträge zur Kenntniss deutscher Käfer. Neueste Schriften der Naturforschenden Gesellschaft zu Halle 2: 1–40
Ahrens, A. 1812–1814: Fauna Insectorum Europae. Halae, C. A. Kümmel (Fasc. 1–2) je [1]+[25] p., je 25 col. Taf.
Ahrens, A. 1829: Kritische Revision der Norddeutschen Käferfauna.[Carabici] [Mitgeteilt von Thon]. – Entomologisches Archiv(Herausgeber T. Thon), Jena – 2 (1) 8–11
Ahrens, A. 1830: Beschreibung einiger deutschen Arten der Gattung Clivina. Entomologisches Archiv (Herausgeber T. Thon), Jena – 2 (2) 57–61
Ahrens, A. 1833: Uebersicht aller bis jetzt auf salzhaltigem Erdboden und in dessen Gewässern entdeckten Käfer.Isis oder Encyclopaedische Zeitung von Oken, Leipzig – [26] (VII) 642–648
Ahrens, A., Germar, E. F., Kaulfuß, F. 1812–1847: Fauna Insectorum Europae. -Halle, Kümmel (Fasc. 1–24) je [1]+[25] p., je 25 col. Taf.

References

Evenhuis, N. L. 1997: Litteratura taxonomica dipterorum (1758–1930). Volume 1 (A-K); Volume 2 (L-Z). 1; 2 Leiden, Backhuys Publishers, VII+1-426; 427–871 pp. 1: 52–53, + Schr.verz.
Germar 1842: [Ahrens, A.] Entomologische Zeitung, Stettin 3, 45–48

German entomologists
1841 deaths
People from Oebisfelde-Weferlingen
Coleopterists
1779 births